The , (or "Re-entry Permit to Japan") is a travel document similar to a certificate of identity, issued by Japan's Ministry of Justice. It is a passport-like booklet with a light brown cover with the words "再入国許可書 RE-ENTRY PERMIT TO JAPAN" on the front.

Eligibility
The purpose of the re-entry permit is to allow residents to leave and return to Japan, and to serve as an international travel document in lieu of a passport.

The Re-entry Permit can be issued to residents of Japan who are stateless or cannot get a passport from their country, such as de facto refugees holding resident status other than as a 1951 Convention Refugee, including those holding a residence status of student, designated activities, etc. under considerations of humanitarian. It is also used by people whose nationality is not recognized in Japan (e.g. North Korean nationals, or Koreans in Japan who retains Joseon nationality but acquired neither South Korea nor North Korea nationality).

Physical appearance
The Re-entry Permit is a passport-like booklet containing 28 pages, including instruction pages, personal information page, and visa pages. The current version's data page is laminated in plastic to prevent tampering.

Data pages
Photo of the holder
Document number
Name (Last, First, Middle)
Nationality
Date of birth
Sex
Address (Prefectures of Japan)
Date of issue
Residence card no.
Status and expiry date of residence status
Issuing authority
Signature of holder
Amendments

The validity of this document is limited to the expiry date on the stamps of re-entry permit shown on visa pages of page 4 to 28 and can be extended, while there is no valid date specified on the personal information page.

Fees
The booklet is free of charge.

However, a visa type Re-entry Permit is required in order to validate this document, with a fee of JP¥3000 (Single) or JP¥6000 (Multiple).

Acceptance

Acceptance of EU member states
, EU member states which have explicitly indicated to the Council of the European Union's Visa Working Party that they will accept the Japan Re-entry Permit for visa issuance purposes include the Belgium, Netherlands, Luxembourg, Czech Republic, Germany, Estonia, Lithuania, Hungary, Austria, Portugal and Slovenia based on the notifications from Member States until 15 March 2022; while other countries did not provide any information on their acceptance of it. As of 2013, Spain, France, and Slovakia have explicitly indicated they will not accept it. Said Re-entry Permit is stated as an "Alien's Travel Document".

Visa Free Access or Visa on Arrival
Since Japan Re-entry Permit is not a regular national passport, most countries and territories require visa prior to arrival.

The following countries and territories provide visa free access or visa on arrival, as they provide everyone such courtesies.

Asia

Re-entry Permit as a Visa

There is also a stamp type re-entry visa calls , which is pasted into a foreign passport or other travel document include this document.

See also

 Refugee Travel Document
 1954 Convention Travel Document
 1954 Convention Relating to the Status of Stateless Persons
 1961 Convention on the Reduction of Statelessness
 Nansen passport
 U.S. Re-entry Permit

References

International travel documents